Trin is a municipality in the Imboden Region in the Swiss canton of Graubünden. Crestasee is located in Trin.

History
Trin is first mentioned in the 12th century as Turunnio.

Geography
 

Trin is perched on the mountain-side above the Rhine valley on the road between Domat/Ems and Flims. The village of Mulin (also in the municipality) is at the foot of the slope on the edge of the valley.

Of this area, 33.2% is used for agricultural purposes, while 24.3% is forested. Of the rest of the land, 1.7% is settled (buildings or roads) and the remainder (40.8%) is non-productive (rivers, glaciers or mountains).

Before 2017, the municipality was located in the Trins sub-district of the Imboden district, after 2017 it was part of the Imboden Region. It consists of the villages of Trin, Digg and Mulin.  Until 1943 Trin was known as Trins.

Demographics

, 11.6% of the population was made up of foreign nationals. Over the last 10 years the population has grown at a rate of 2.1%.

, the gender distribution of the population was 50.4% male and 49.6% female.  The age distribution, in Trin is; 134 people or 12.1% of the population are between 0 and 9 years old.  74 people or 6.7% are 10 to 14, and 71 people or 6.4% are 15 to 19.  Of the adult population, 97 people or 8.8% of the population are between 20 and 29 years old.  179 people or 16.2% are 30 to 39, 187 people or 16.9% are 40 to 49, and 160 people or 14.4% are 50 to 59.  The senior population distribution is 97 people or 8.8% of the population are between 60 and 69 years old, 63 people or 5.7% are 70 to 79, there are 38 people or 3.4% who are 80 to 89, and there are 8 people or 0.7% who are 90 to 99.

In the 2007 federal election the most popular party was the FDP which received 36.4% of the vote.  The next three most popular parties were the SVP (27.8%), the SPS (27.2%) and the CVP (7.7%).

In Trin about 71.3% of the population (between age 25 and 64) have completed either non-mandatory upper secondary education or additional higher education (either university or a Fachhochschule).

Trin has an unemployment rate of 1.62%.  , there were 47 people employed in the primary economic sector and about 18 businesses involved in this sector.  120 people are employed in the secondary sector and there are 13 businesses in this sector.  87 people are employed in the tertiary sector, with 32 businesses in this sector.

Of the rest of the population,  there are 12 individuals (or about 1.08% of the population) who belong to the Orthodox Church, and there are 23 individuals (or about 2.08% of the population) who belong to another Christian church. There are 9 (or about 0.81% of the population) who are Islamic. There are 6 individuals (or about 0.54% of the population) who belong to another church (not listed on the census), 84 (or about 7.58% of the population) belong to no church, are agnostic or atheist, and 99 individuals (or about 8.94% of the population) did not answer the question.

The historical population is given in the following table:

Languages
Most of the population speaks German (72.7%), with Romansh being second most common (19.8%) and Italian being third ( 3.0%).

Heritage sites of national significance
The Crap Sogn Parcazi, a ruined castle and fortified church is listed as a Swiss heritage site of national significance.

Transportation
The municipality has a railway station, on the Reichenau-Tamins–Disentis/Mustér line.

References

External links
 

 
Municipalities of Graubünden
Cultural property of national significance in Graubünden